This is a list of traditional songs associated with Cornell University.  Most of the songs were popularized by, and were written by members or alumni of, the Cornell Glee Club, Cornell's tenor-bass chorus.  Most formal concerts of the Glee Club or Cornell Chorus conclude with selections of Cornell songs.  The songs are also sung at football games and played by the marching band.

The list is in chronological order and includes the first line of each song, as that is how many students identify the songs.

Presently performed
These songs have been performed by the Glee Club or Chorus at least as recently as 2007. Several, such as the Alma Mater and the Evening Song, are performed multiple times per year. Others, such as the Crew Song, may be revived only once every two to three years.

Alma Mater – "Far above Cayuga's waters..."
Words: Wilmot Moses Smith, Class of 1874, and Archibald Croswell Weeks, Class of 1872
Music: H. S. Thompson
Written: 1857 (music), 1870 (words)
Evening Song – "When the sun fades far away..."
Words: Henry Tyrrell, Class of 1880
Music: Traditional (O Tannenbaum)
Written: 1877 (words)
Song of the Classes – "Oh, I am the freshman..."
Words: Frank Addison Abbott, Class of 1890
Music: Traditional
Written: 1890 (words)
Crew Song – "Onward like the swallow going..."
Words: Robert James Kellogg, Class of 1891
Music: William Luton Wood
Written: 1892 (words), 1900 (music)
Alumni Song – "I am thinking tonight of my old college town..."
Words: Louis Carl Ehle, Class of 1890
Music: William Luton Wood
Written: 1893 (words), 1900 (music)
Davy – "Give my regards to Davy..."
Words: Charles Edward Tourison, Class of 1906, W. L. Umstad, Class of 1906, and Bill Forbes, Class of 1906
Music: George M. Cohan
Written: 1905
The Big Red Team – "See them plunging down to the goal..."
Words: Romeyn Berry, Class of 1904
Music: Charles Edward Tourison, Class of 1906
Written: 1905
Fight for Cornell – "From rocky height..."
Words: Kenneth Roberts, Class of 1908
Music: Theodore Julius Lindorff, Class of 1907
Written: 1906
My Old Cornell – "Oh, I want to go back to the old days..."
Words: Will A. Dillon
Music: Will A. Dillon
Written: 1917
Strike Up a Song to Cornell – "Strike up a song to Cornell..."
Words: Richard Henry Lee, Class of 1941
Music: Richard Henry Lee, Class of 1941
Written: 1940
The Hill – "I wake at night and think I hear remembered chimes..."
Words: Albert William Smith, Class of 1878
Music: George Franklin Pond, Class of 1910
Written: 1921 (words), 1928 (music)
Quarter Bells – "Once more. Once more I'm hurrying past the towers..."
Words: Anonymous, The Cornellian (Cornell Yearbook), 1900
Music: Robert Shapiro, Class of 2004
Written: 2004

Performed in the past
These songs are no longer performed regularly.

Cornell – "The soldier loves his gen'ral's fame..."
Words: George Kingsley Birge, Class of 1872
Music: James Power
Written: 1847 (music), 1869 (words)
The Chimes – "To the busy morning light..."
Words: Francis Miles Finch
Music: George F. Root
Written: 1861 (music), 1869 (words)
1875 – "'Twas on a sunny summer morn..."
Words: John De Witt Warner, Class of 1872
Music: Archibald Croswell Weeks, Class of 1872
Written: 1875 (words), 1889 (music)
Cornell Hymn – "Lo, at her feet the valley lies..."
Words: Albert William Smith, Class of 1878
Music: James Thomas Quarles
Written: 1905
Carnelian and White – "Cornell colors are waving today..."
Words: Kenneth Roberts, Class of 1908
Music: Theodore Julius Lindorff, Class of 1907
Written: 1906
Cornell Victorious – "From blue cayuga..."
Words: Silas Hibbard Ayer, Jr., Class of 1914
Music: Silas Hibbard Ayer, Jr., Class of 1914
Written: 1915
Hail Thou in Majesty, Cornell – "Hail thou in majesty, Cornell..."
Words: Albert William Smith, Class of 1878
Music: George Franklin Pond, Class of 1910
Written: Unknown
Tales of Old Cornell – "She stands upon her hill, serene..."
Words: Morris Gilbert Bishop, Class of 1914
Music: Ludwig F. Audrieth, Class of 1926
Written: 1928 (music)
March On, Cornell – "Onward, Cornell, to the top where you belong..."
Words: Marcel Kleinert Sessler, Class of 1913
Music: Marcel Kleinert Sessler, Class of 1913
Written: 1936
In the Red and the White – "In the red and the white..."
Words: Richard Henry Lee, Class of 1941
Music: Richard Henry Lee, Class of 1941
Written: 1939
Cornell Champions – "Cornell champions are winning the game..."
Words: John Paul Timmerman, Jr., Class of 1950
Music: John Paul Timmerman, Jr., Class of 1950
Written: 1975

References

See also
Cornell University
Cornell University Chorus
Cornell Glee Club
Fight song

Cornell University
American college songs
Institutional songs
Lists of songs